"My Sister" is a song written by Amy Dalley, Bonnie Baker and Roxie Dean, and recorded by American country music artist Reba McEntire.  It was released in March 2005 as the fourth single from the album Room to Breathe.  The song reached #16 on the Billboard Hot Country Singles & Tracks chart.

Chart performance

References

2005 singles
Reba McEntire songs
Songs written by Roxie Dean
Song recordings produced by Buddy Cannon
Song recordings produced by Norro Wilson
MCA Nashville Records singles
2003 songs
Songs written by Bonnie Baker (songwriter)